Leonard John "Len" Diett (1939-2018) was a cross code player who represented Australia in Rugby Union and also played rugby league for North Sydney in the NSWRL competition.

Early life
Diett was born in Sydney and grew up in the Northern Beaches of the city.  He played his junior rugby union with Manly-Warringah.  Diett became captain of his local club at the age of 19.

Playing career
In 1959, Diett was selected to play for the Australian rugby union side and became the second youngest person to achieve this honor.  In 1962, Diett decided to switch codes and joined NSWRL team North Sydney.  In 1964, Diett was selected to play for New South Wales and featured in one game.  In 1965, North Sydney had one of their best seasons in a number of years finishing second on the table.  In the finals series, Diett featured in both games against South Sydney and St George which both ended in defeat.  Diett played one more season with Norths before retiring at the end of 1966.  He died at Ballina on the New South Wales north coast on 13 January 2018.

References

Australian rugby union players
Australia international rugby union players
1939 births
2018 deaths
North Sydney Bears players
Rugby union players from Sydney
Australian rugby league players